Sevenair SA, formerly branded Aero VIP, is a Portuguese regional airline headquartered in Cascais Aerodrome, western Lisbon. It operates domestic regional routes within mainland Portugal and also offers additional aviation services and non-scheduled operations in third countries. It is part of Sevenair Group, one of the biggest aeronautical groups operating in Portugal, which provides the following services: air transportation (regional and non-scheduled), aerial works, flying school, and aircraft maintenance.

In September 2022 the Sevenair Academy acquired all the assets of the North American L3Harris Technologies in Ponte de Sor, with the intention of creating the largest aviation school in Europe.

History
Before integrating the Sevenair Group, the airline was named AeroVip, of which it still maintains in 2019 the codes (WV/RVP).

In September 2022, Sevenair Academy announced the purchase of all the actives from the American L3 Harris school in Ponte de Sor, becoming the biggest flight school in Europe.

Destinations

As of March 2019, Sevenair served the following destinations:
 
 (BGC) Bragança
 (VRL) Vila Real 
 (VSE) Viseu
 (CAT) Lisbon–Cascais (base)
 (PRM) Portimão

Fleet

The Sevenair fleet includes the following aircraft.

Airline
 3 Dornier 228 – CS-AYT, CS-DVU (+1 stored)
 1 Jetstream 32 – CS-DVQ

Air services
 4 Cessna 172 Rocket (used for banner towing)
 2 Socata Rallye (used for banner towing)
 2 Cessna 182 Skylane (used for skydiving operations)
 2 Pilatus PC-6 (used for skydiving operations)
 1 Piper PA-31 Chieftain (stored)
 6 CASA C212 Aviocar (stored)

Air academy
 9  Cessna 150 and 152
 1  Cessna 172RG
 8  Tecnam P2008
 1  Tecnam P2010
 3  Tecnam P2006T
 1  Diamond DA42 (VIP)
 4  Diamond DA42
 7  Diamond DA40
 13 Piper PA28
 1  Cessna 152 Aerobatic

Accidents and incidents
 On 2 December 2010, an Aero VIP Dornier 228, registration CS-TGG, flight 854 on a domestic route (Lisbon-Vila Real-Bragança), was on final approach to Braganca (LPBG) around 17:20 local time. There was snowfall and fog at the time. The airplane got too low and the nose gear cut a power line. The crew went around and landed the aircraft safely. The aircraft was not damaged and no injuries occurred. The incident left 2000 people without electricity for two hours.

References

External links
 

Airlines of Portugal
Portuguese brands
Portuguese companies established in 1998